Artur Szeliski (born 28 October 1979 in Gdańsk) is a Polish ice dancer. He competed with Molly Marcon, with whom he was the 2002 Polish national silver medalist. He previously skated with Luiza Kowalczyk and Diana Chabros.

Competitive highlights
2002 : Polish Nationals - 2nd,
2001 : World Junior Figure Skating Championships - 17th,
2001 : Golden Spin of Zagreb - 8th.

External links
 

1979 births
Polish male ice dancers
Living people
Sportspeople from Gdańsk